Jeffrey Scot Baisley (born December 19, 1982) is an American former professional baseball third baseman who played in Major League Baseball (MLB) for the Oakland Athletics in 2008.

College career
A native of Tampa, Florida, Baisley attended the University of South Florida, where he played college baseball for the Bulls.  While there, he was named to the All-Tournament Team in the 2002 Conference USA baseball tournament, in which South Florida was a semi-finalist. In 2003, he played collegiate summer baseball with the Cotuit Kettleers of the Cape Cod Baseball League.

Professional career

Oakland Athletics
Baisley was drafted by the Oakland Athletics in the 12th round of the 2005 Major League Baseball Draft out of the University of South Florida. He made his professional debut that year with the Vancouver Canadians. In , playing for the Kane County Cougars, Baisley was selected as the Midwest League Most Valuable Player as the stand-out contributor to the 2006 Cougars' offense. The 6'3" Baisley drove in 110 runs and hitting 22 homers. His most notable performance was a game when he hit three home runs, the last of which was postponed during an umpire discussion on the eligibility of a home run that hit the scoreboard. Baisley was ultimately awarded the homer. He was called up to the major leagues on September 9, and made his debut that night against the Detroit Tigers going hitless in two at-bats with a walk. He collected his first base hit on September 18 against the Los Angeles Angels of Anaheim. He played in 14 games with the Athletics, hitting .256.

Los Angeles Angels of Anaheim
On March 10, 2011, that Baisley signed a minor league contract with the Angels and he played in 134 games with the Salt Lake Bees in 2011, hitting .303 with 20 home runs and 100 RBI.

Los Angeles Dodgers
He signed a minor league contract with the Los Angeles Dodgers in December 2011, that included an invitation to Major League camp. He was assigned to the AAA Albuquerque Isotopes, where he played in 62 games and hit .284. Baisley was released by the Dodgers on June 12, 2012.

Detroit Tigers

On June 19, 2012, Baisley signed a minor league contract with the Detroit Tigers, and was added to their Triple-A roster, the Toledo Mud Hens. After just 10 games, where he hit .081 (3 hits in 37 at bats), he was released.

Chicago White Sox
On July 3, 2012, Baisley agreed to terms with the White Sox and was added to their Triple-A roster, the Charlotte Knights. He was released in August.

Acereros del Norte
On April 20, 2013, Baisley signed with the Acereros del Norte of the Mexican League.

References

External links

1982 births
Living people
American expatriate baseball players in Canada
American expatriate baseball players in Mexico
Acereros de Monclova players
Albuquerque Isotopes players
Arizona League Athletics players
Baseball players from Tampa, Florida
Charlotte Knights players
Cotuit Kettleers players
Kane County Cougars players
Major League Baseball third basemen
Mexican League baseball third basemen
Midland RockHounds players
Oakland Athletics players
Sacramento River Cats players
Salt Lake Bees players
Somerset Patriots players
South Florida Bulls baseball players
Tiburones de La Guaira players
American expatriate baseball players in Venezuela
Toledo Mud Hens players
Vancouver Canadians players